Evraz Oregon Steel Mills  is a subsidiary of the Russia steel producer Evraz Group and has operations in Portland, Oregon, United States, and also with facilities in Colorado and Alberta. The company produces items such as structural tubing, pipes, and steel rails.

History
Oregon Steel began as Gilmore Steel in 1926 when William G. Gilmore started the company.

Thomas Boklund became president of Oregon Steel Mills in 1982, CEO in 1985 and chairman of the board in 1992. In 1987 the company became Oregon Steel Mills. and went public in 1988 (trading on the NYSE as OS), launching a series of acquisitions. In 1993, OSM purchased Colorado Fuel and Iron.

In January 2007 Evraz Group S.A. of Russia bought OSM for $2.3 billion. In February 2010, Jim Declusin stepped down as CEO of Evraz Oregon Steel Mills after 4 years in office. In January 2011, the company announced moving its headquarters from Portland to Chicago.

In April 2020, Evraz Oregon Steel Mills stopped operating its Portland spiral pipe mill, leading to 230 permanent job cuts. This decision follows the gas and oil industry's downturn amid the coronavirus crisis. 65 more workers were laid off in June 2020 at its North Portland mill. This pipe mill had closed in 2009 and reopened in 2012 following the nation's boost in natural gas and oil drilling production. The facilities in Oregon were using steel slabs imported from Russia, but importing steel from Russia became much more expensive (25% import tariff) during the Trump administration. Evras Oregon Steel Mill is the only steel sheet mill west of the Rockies. Evraz was the largest carbon emitter of the city of Portland.

As a result of sanctions placed against it as a result of the 2022 Russian invasion of Ukraine, on August 10, 2022, Evraz announced its intention to sell its North American assets.

Operations
OSM operates a variety of steel production facilities. These include a plate mill at their OSM Rolling Mill at the Portland Steelworks in Portland, Oregon. OSM manufactures armor plating for the U.S. military. Also at the Portland Steelworks is OSM Tubular that makes pipes for use in areas such as oil and natural gas transmission, this plant was closed in 2015. Oregon Steel's Canadian operations also produce tubular steel products. In Oregon, OSM also operates a structural tubing facility, the only producer in the Northwest, this plant was sold in 2015.

In Colorado, OSM's Rocky Mountain Steel subsidiary operates three production facilities. One facility makes rails for railroads, one rods and bars for construction, and the third plant manufactures seamless pipes. These facilities were part of the  Colorado Fuel and Iron Company, founded in 1881 and bought by OSM in 1993.

Bibliography
 Roger S. Ahlbrandt, The Renaissance of American Steel. Oxford University Press. 1996.

References

External links
Portland Business Journal: Evraz Oregon Steel Mills, Inc.

Defense companies of the United States
Manufacturing companies established in 1926
Steel companies of the United States
1926 establishments in Oregon
Manufacturing companies based in Portland, Oregon
Companies based in St. Johns, Portland, Oregon
2007 mergers and acquisitions
American subsidiaries of foreign companies
Evraz
Rail infrastructure manufacturers